Stokkers is a Dutch surname. Notable people with the surname include:

Finn Stokkers (born 1996), Dutch footballer
Lesley Stokkers (born 1987), Dutch cricketer
Patricia Stokkers (born 1976), Dutch swimmer

Dutch-language surnames